Suzanne Cleminshaw is an American writer based in Britain.

Biography
Her book, The Great Ideas, was shortlisted for the First Novel category at the 1999 Whitbread Awards.

She studied creative writing at the University of East Anglia.

She is Buzz Aldrin's niece.

References

Living people
Alumni of the University of East Anglia
American women novelists
Year of birth missing (living people)
21st-century American women